The Cornell–Hobart rivalry is an intercollegiate lacrosse rivalry between the Cornell Big Red, which represent Cornell University, and the Hobart Statesmen, which represent Hobart College. It is one of the oldest rivalries in college lacrosse; the inaugural game in the series was played on April 5, 1898, with Hobart prevailing by a score of 2–1. As of 2019, Cornell leads the series 87–47–4. The game is the oldest ongoing college lacrosse series. The Johns Hopkins–Maryland lacrosse rivalry began in 1895, but the teams only played 7 times before 1924.

In 1995, Hobart promoted its team from Division III to Division I to preserve the lacrosse rivalry with Cornell and a similar one with the Syracuse Orange. In 2008, the continuation of the series was put in jeopardy when the Hobart Board of Trustees decided to reclassify its lacrosse program back to the Division III level on April 26. After an emotional reaction from the alumni community, however, the decision was reversed on May 1. The following day, Cornell played the first night game at Hobart's Boswell Field, in which the #8 Big Red beat the Statesmen by a score of 15 to 7.

Like Cornell, Hobart has never awarded athletic scholarships, and could not after the men's lacrosse program moved to Division I in 1995 due to NCAA policy. Unlike Johns Hopkins, which was grandfathered, Statesmen lacrosse is one of only five Division III programs to compete in Division I without athletic scholarships.

Rival Accomplishments 
The following summarizes the accomplishments of the two programs.

 21 of Hobart's NCAA tournament appearances and all 15 titles came at either the NCAA Division II or III level.

Game Results

References

College lacrosse rivalries in the United States
Hobart
Hobart and William Smith Colleges
Hobart Statesmen men's lacrosse
1896 establishments in New York (state)